Ask Shagg was a syndicated daily comic strip drawn by cartoonist Peter Guren from 1980 to 2020. It was distributed by Creators Syndicate; it had been distributed by United Feature Syndicate from 1980 until 1995. The strip has run in dozens of newspapers including The Boston Globe, The Columbus Dispatch, and the Seattle Post-Intelligencer. In each strip Guren, through his Shagg E. Dawg character, answered questions from readers about the animal kingdom. The strip retired on the 5th of January, 2020.

Characters and story 
The strip featured lead character Shagg E. Dawg answering questions about animals that were sent in by readers.  Questions about particular animals are sometimes answered by the strip's other characters, Rosko the cat, Mouth the myna bird, and Slippy the flying squirrel.  In 1995 Guren was receiving more than 15,000 letters a year, with about 75% of them from children. Readers received a free Shagg doll if their question appeared in the strip.

The strips generally featured a joke of some sort about the subject animal in addition to providing an accurate answer to the day's question. (For example, one strip answered a question about hamsters storing food in their cheeks and then compared it to a human carrying their money in their mouths. The last panel then showed a picture of a person holding their money in their mouth.)

Community service
Guren has often used  Ask Shagg to raise money or awareness for causes. His Shagg E. Dawg character was used on information cards about endangered species that were included with kid's  meals from Wendy's fast-food restaurants in 1993.

Website
Guren launched his first Ask Shagg website in May 1996 and began putting the site's address in the newspaper version of his strip. The site AskShagg.com features a search engine with which users can search for "Ask Shagg" comic strips with questions about a particular animal.

Book
In 1985 World Almanac Publications published the book Ask Shagg, with the attribution "by Shagg E. Dawg as told to Peter Guren." It was distributed in the United States by Ballantine Books.

References

External links
 
 Ask Shagg comics at Creators Syndicate
 Ask Shagg (YouTube) - Official Shagg E. Dawg YouTube channel
 Ask Shagg Facebook page

1980 comics debuts
2020 comics endings
Gag-a-day comics
Educational comics
Comics about animals
Comics about dogs
Advice columns
Comics characters introduced in 1980